Social BPM is a discipline which combines traditional Business Process Management techniques with Web 2.0 "social" tools and technologies, to facilitate business improvement efforts.

There is debate about whether Social BPM is a methodology, a set of technologies, or just a buzzword. Forrester Research's Clay Richardson defines Social BPM to include:
 A methodology
 Social Networking principles
 A combination of Web 2.0 and social tools with BPM to enable bi-directional collaboration

See also 
 Business Process Management
 Business Process Reengineering
 Process improvement

References

External links 
 http://social-biz.org/2010/05/12/who-is-socializing-in-social-bpm-2/
 http://www.column2.com/2010/05/will-social-revive-interest-in-bpm-will-bpm-make-social-relevant/

Business process management